Tuolumne may refer to:

 Tuolumne River, one of the major rivers draining the western slope Sierra Nevada mountains
 Tuolumne Grove, of giant sequoia trees, in Yosemite National Park
 Tuolumne Meadows, in the eastern section of Yosemite National Park
 Grand Canyon of the Tuolumne, also in Yosemite National Park
 Tuolumne County, California, located in the Sierra Nevada
 Tuolumne City, California, an unincorporated community in Tuolumne County
 "Tuolumne", a song by Eddie Vedder from the soundtrack for Into the Wild